The barn owl (Tyto alba) is the most widely distributed species of owl in the world and one of the most widespread of all species of birds, being found almost everywhere except for the polar and desert regions, Asia north of the Himalayas, most of Indonesia, and some Pacific Islands. It is also known as the common barn owl, to distinguish it from the other species in its family, Tytonidae, which forms one of the two main lineages of living owls, the other being the typical owls (Strigidae).

There are at least three major lineages of barn owl: the western barn owl of Europe, western Asia, and Africa; the eastern barn owl of southeastern Asia and Australasia; and the American barn owl of the Americas. Some taxonomic authorities classify barn owls differently, recognising up to five separate species; and further research needs to be done to resolve the disparate taxonomies. The plumage on the head and back is a mottled shade of grey or brown; that on the underparts varies from white to brown and is sometimes speckled with dark markings. The face is characteristically heart-shaped and is white in most subspecies. This owl does not hoot, but utters an eerie, drawn-out screech.

The barn owl is nocturnal over most of its range; but in Great Britain and some Pacific Islands, it also hunts by day. Barn owls specialise in hunting animals on the ground and nearly all of their food consists of small mammals, which they locate by sound, their hearing being very acute. The owls usually mate for life unless one of the pair is killed, whereupon a new pair bond may be formed. Breeding takes place at varying times of the year, according to the locality, with a clutch of eggs, averaging about four in number, being laid in a nest in a hollow tree, old building, or fissure in a cliff. The female does all the incubation, and she and the young chicks are reliant on the male for food. When large numbers of small prey are readily available, barn owl populations can expand rapidly; and globally the bird is considered to be of least conservation concern. Some subspecies with restricted ranges are more threatened.

Etymology
The barn owl was one of several species of bird first described in 1769 by the Tyrolean physician and naturalist Giovanni Antonio Scopoli in his  Anni Historico-Naturales. He gave it the scientific name Strix alba. Tyto alba literally means 'white owl', from the onomatopoeic Ancient Greek  ('owl') – compare English "hooter" – and Latin , 'white'.

The bird is known by many common names that refer to its appearance, call, habitat, or its eerie, silent flight: white owl, silver owl, demon owl, ghost owl, death owl, night owl, rat owl, church owl, cave owl, stone owl, monkey-faced owl, hissing owl, hobgoblin or hobby owl, dobby owl, white-breasted owl, golden owl, screech owl, straw owl, barnyard owl, and delicate owl. "Golden owl" might also refer to the related golden masked owl (T. aurantia). "Hissing owl" and, particularly in the U.K. and in India, "screech owl" refer to the piercing calls of these birds. The latter name is also applied to a different group of birds, the screech-owls in the genus Megascops.

Description

The barn owl is a medium-sized, pale-coloured owl with long wings and a short, squarish tail. Adult body mass is also variable with male owls from the Galapagos weighing  while male Pacific barn owls average . In general, owls living on small islands are smaller and lighter, perhaps because they have a higher dependence on insect prey and need to be more manoeuvrable. The shape of the tail is a means of distinguishing the barn owl from typical owls when seen in the air. Other distinguishing features are the undulating flight pattern and the dangling, feathered legs. The pale face with its heart shape and black eyes give the flying bird a distinctive appearance, like a flat mask with oversized, oblique black eyeslits, the ridge of feathers above the bill somewhat resembling a nose.

The bird's head and upper body typically vary between pale brown and some shade of grey (especially on the forehead and back) in most subspecies. Some are purer, richer brown instead, and all have fine black-and-white speckles except on the remiges and rectrices (main wing feathers), which are light brown with darker bands. The heart-shaped face is usually bright white, but in some subspecies it is brown. The underparts, including the tarsometatarsal (lower leg) feathers, vary from white to reddish buff among the subspecies, and are either mostly unpatterned or bear a varying number of tiny blackish-brown speckles. It has been found that at least in the continental European populations, females with more spotting are healthier than plainer birds. This does not hold true for European males by contrast, where the spotting varies according to subspecies. The bill varies from pale horn to dark buff, corresponding to the general plumage hue, and the iris is blackish brown. The toes, like the bill, vary in colour, ranging from pink to dark pinkish-grey and the talons are black.

Both leucistic and melanistic barn owls have been recorded in the wild and in captivity, with melanistic individuals estimated to occur with odds of 1 out of every 100,000 birds.

On average within any one population, males tend to have fewer spots on the underside and are paler in colour than females. The latter are also larger with a strong female T. alba of a large subspecies weighing over 550 g (19.4 oz), while males are typically about 10% lighter. Nestlings are covered in white down, but the heart-shaped facial disk becomes visible soon after hatching.

Contrary to popular belief, the barn owl does not hoot (such calls are made by typical owls, like the tawny owl or other members of the genus Strix). It instead produces a characteristic piercing shree scream, ear-shattering at close range, an eerie, long-drawn-out shriek. Males in courtship give a shrill twitter. Both young and old can hiss like a snake to scare away intruders. Other sounds produced include a purring chirrup denoting pleasure, and a "kee-yak", which resembles one of the vocalisations of the tawny owl. When captured or cornered, the barn owl throws itself on its back and flails with sharp-taloned feet, making for an effective defence. In such situations it may emit rasping sounds or clicking snaps, produced probably by the bill but possibly by the tongue.

Distribution

The barn owl is the most widespread landbird species in the world, occurring on every continent except Antarctica. Its range includes all of Europe (except Fennoscandia and Malta), most of Africa apart from the Sahara, the Indian subcontinent, Southeast Asia, Australia, many Pacific Islands, and North-, Central-, and South America. In general, it is considered to be sedentary; and, indeed, many individuals, having taken up residence in a particular location, remain there even when better nearby foraging areas are available.

In continental Europe the dispersal distance is greater, commonly somewhere between  but exceptionally , with ringed birds from the Netherlands ending up in Spain and in Ukraine. Dispersal movements in the African continent include  from Senegambia to Sierra Leone and up to  within South Africa. In Australia there is some migration as the birds move towards the northern coast in the dry season and southward in the wet season, as well as nomadic movements in association with rodent plagues. Occasionally, some of these birds turn up on Norfolk Island, Lord Howe Island, or New Zealand, showing that crossing the ocean is within their capabilities. In 2008, barn owls were recorded for the first time breeding in New Zealand. The barn owl has been successfully introduced into the Hawaiian island of Kauai in an attempt to control rodents; distressingly, it has been found to also feed on native birds.

Taxonomy

The ashy-faced owl (T. glaucops) was for some time included in T. alba. Based on DNA evidence, König, Weick & Becking (2009) recognised the American barn owl (T. furcata) and the Curaçao barn owl (T. bargei) as separate species. They proposed that T. a. delicatula should be split off as a separate species, to be known as the eastern barn owl, which would include the subspecies T. d. delicatula, T. d. sumbaensis, T. d. meeki, T. d. crassirostris, and T. d. interposita. As of 2021, the International Ornithological Committee had not accepted the split of Tyto delicatula from T. alba.

Some island subspecies are occasionally treated as distinct species, a move which should await further research into barn owl phylogeography. According to Murray Bruce in Handbook of Birds of the World Volume 5: Barn-owls to Hummingbirds, "a review of the whole group [is] long overdue". Molecular analysis of mitochondrial DNA shows a separation of the species into two clades, an Old World alba and a New World furcata, but this study did not include T. a. delicatula, which the authors seem to have accepted as a separate species. Extensive genetic variation was found between the Indonesian T. a. stertens and other members of the alba clade, leading to the separation of stertens into Tyto javanica.

Twenty to thirty subspecies are usually recognized, varying mainly in body proportions, size, and colour. Barn owls range in colour from the almost beige-and-white nominate subspecies alba, erlangeri, and niveicauda, to the nearly black-and-brown contempta. Island forms are mostly smaller than mainland ones, and those inhabiting forests have darker plumage and shorter wings than those living in open grasslands. Several subspecies are generally considered to be intergrades between more distinct populations.

In Handbook of Birds of the World Volume 5: Barn-owls to Hummingbirds, the following subspecies are listed:

Behaviour and ecology
Like most owls, the barn owl is nocturnal, relying on its acute sense of hearing when hunting in complete darkness. It often becomes active shortly before dusk but can sometimes be seen during the day when relocating from one roosting site to another. In Britain, on various Pacific Islands, and perhaps elsewhere, it sometimes hunts by day. The owl's daylight hunting may depend on whether it can avoid being mobbed by other birds during that time. In Britain, some birds continue to hunt by day—even when mobbed by such birds as magpies, rooks, and black-headed gulls—possibly because the previous night has been wet, making night hunting difficult. By contrast, in southern Europe and the tropics, the birds seem to be almost exclusively nocturnal, with the few birds that hunt by day being severely mobbed.
In some cases, an owl feeling threatened by the mobbing of a crow may become aggressive enough to decapitate the crow.

Barn owls are not particularly territorial but have a home range inside which they forage. Female home ranges largely coincide with that of their mates. Outside the breeding season, males and females usually roost separately, each one having about three favoured sites in which to conceal themselves by day, and which are also visited for short periods during the night. Roosting sites include holes in trees, fissures in cliffs, disused buildings, chimneys, and hay sheds, and are often small in comparison to nesting sites. As the breeding season approaches, the birds move back to the vicinity of a chosen nest to roost. In a situation where a bird (e.g., pigeon) intrudes an owl nest, a male barn owl is observed to be docile and curious, while a female owl is protective of its chicks and may attack the bird, and the chicks themselves are seen to display a defensive behaviour.

This owl prefers to hunt along the edges of woods or in rough grass strips adjoining pasture. It has an effortless wavering flight as it quarters the ground, alert to the sounds made by potential prey. Like most owls, the barn owl flies silently; tiny serrations on the leading edges of its flight feathers and a hairlike fringe on the trailing edges help to break up the flow of air over the wings, thereby reducing turbulence and the noise that accompanies it. Hairlike extensions to the barbules of its feathers, which give the plumage a soft feel, also minimise noise produced during wingbeats. Behavioural and environmental preferences may differ slightly even between neighbouring subspecies, as shown in the case of the European T. a. guttata and  T. a. alba, which probably evolved, respectively, in allopatric glacial refugia in southeastern Europe, and in Iberia or southern France.

Hunting and feeding
Hunting in twilight or at night, the barn owl can target its prey and dive to the ground. Its legs and toes are long and slender, which improves its ability to forage among dense foliage or beneath the snow, and gives it a wide spread of talons when attacking prey. This bird hunts by flying slowly, quartering the ground and hovering over spots that may conceal prey. It has long, broad wings that enable it to manoeuvre and turn abruptly. It has acute hearing, with ears placed asymmetrically, which improves detection of sound position and distance; the bird does not require sight to hunt. The facial disc helps with the bird's hearing, as is shown by the fact that, with the ruff feathers removed, the bird can still determine a sound source's direction, although without the disc it can't determine the source's height. It may perch on branches, fence posts, or other lookouts to scan its surroundings; and this is the main means of prey location in the oil palm plantations of Malaysia.

Rodents and other small mammals may constitute over ninety percent of the prey caught. Birds are also taken, as well as lizards, amphibians, fish, and insects. Even when they are plentiful, and other prey scarce, earthworms do not seem to be consumed. In North America and most of Europe, voles predominate in the diet and shrews are the second most common food choice. In Ireland, the accidental introduction of the bank vole in the 1950s led to a major shift in the barn owl's diet: where their ranges overlap, the vole is now by far the largest prey item. Mice and rats are the main foodstuffs in the Mediterranean region, the tropics, subtropics, and Australia. Gophers, muskrats, hares, rabbits, and bats are also preyed upon. Barn owls are usually specialist feeders in productive areas and generalists in areas where prey is scarce. 

On the Cape Verde Islands, geckos are the mainstay of the diet, supplemented by birds such as plovers, godwits, turnstones, weavers, and pratincoles. On a rocky islet off the coast of California, a clutch of four young were being reared on a diet of Leach's storm petrel (Oceanodroma leucorhoa). On bird-rich islands, a barn owl might include birds as some fifteen to twenty percent of its diet, while in grassland it will gorge itself on swarming termites, or on Orthoptera such as Copiphorinae katydids, Jerusalem crickets (Stenopelmatidae), or true crickets (Gryllidae). Smaller prey is usually torn into chunks and eaten completely, including bones and fur, while prey larger than about —such as baby rabbits, Cryptomys blesmols, or Otomys vlei rats—is usually dismembered and the inedible parts discarded.

Compared to other owls of similar size, the barn owl has a much higher metabolic rate, requiring relatively more food. Relative to its size, barn owls consume more rodents. Studies have shown that an individual barn owl may eat one or more voles (or their equivalent) per night, equivalent to about fourteen percent of the bird's bodyweight. Excess food is often cached at roosting sites and can be used when food is scarce. This makes the barn owl one of the most economically valuable wildlife animals for agriculture. Farmers often find these owls more effective than poison in keeping down rodent pests, and they can encourage barn owl habitation by providing nesting sites.

Breeding

Barn owls living in tropical regions can breed at any time of year, but some seasonality in nesting is still evident. Where there are distinct wet and dry seasons, egg-laying usually takes place during the dry season, with increased rodent prey becoming available to the birds as the vegetation dies off. In arid regions, such as parts of Australia, breeding may be irregular and may happen in wet periods, with the resultant temporary increase in the populations of small mammals. In temperate climates, nesting seasons become more distinct, and there are some seasons of the year when no egg-laying takes place. In Europe and North America, most nesting takes place between March and June, when temperatures are increasing. The actual dates of egg-laying vary by year and by location, being correlated with the amount of prey-rich foraging habitat around the nest site. An increase in rodent populations will usually stimulate the local barn owls to begin nesting, and, consequently, two broods are often raised in a good year, even in the cooler parts of the owl's range.

Females are ready to breed at ten to eleven months of age. Barn owls are usually monogamous, sticking to one partner for life unless one of a pair dies. During the non-breeding season they may roost separately, but as the breeding season approaches, they return to their established nesting site, showing considerable site fidelity. In colder climates, in harsh weather, and where winter food supplies may be scarce, they may roost in farm buildings and in barns between hay bales, but they then run the risk that their selected nesting hole may be taken over by some other species. Single males may establish feeding territories, patrolling the hunting areas, occasionally stopping to hover, and perching on lofty eminences where they screech to attract a mate. Where a female has lost her mate but maintained her breeding site, she usually seems to attract a new spouse.

Once a pair-bond has been formed, the male will make short flights at dusk around the nesting and roosting sites and then longer circuits to establish a home range. When he is later joined by the female, there is much chasing, turning, and twisting in flight, and frequent screeches, the male's being high-pitched and tremulous and the female's lower and harsher. In later stages of courtship, the male emerges at dusk, climbs high into the sky, and then swoops back to the vicinity of the female at speed. He then sets off to forage. The female meanwhile sits in an eminent position and preens, returning to the nest a minute or two before the male arrives with food for her. Such feeding behaviour of the female by the male is common, helps build the pair-bond, and increases the female's fitness before egg-laying commences.

Barn owls are cavity nesters. They choose holes in trees, fissures in cliff faces, the large nests of other birds such as the hamerkop (Scopus umbretta), and, particularly in Europe and North America, old buildings such as farm sheds and church towers. Buildings are preferred to trees in wetter climates in the British Isles and provide better protection for fledglings from inclement weather. Tree nests tend to be in open habitats rather than in the middle of woodland, and nest holes tend to be higher in North America than in Europe, because of possible predation by raccoons (Procyon lotor). No nesting material is used as such but, as the female sits incubating the eggs, she draws in the dry furry material of which her regurgitated pellets are composed, so that by the time the chicks are hatched, they are surrounded by a carpet of shredded pellets. Oftentimes other birds such as jackdaws (Corvus monedula) nest in the same hollow tree or building and seem to live harmoniously with the owls.

Before commencing laying, the female spends much time near the nest and is entirely provisioned by the male. Meanwhile, the male roosts nearby and may cache any prey that is surplus to their requirements. When the female has reached peak weight, the male provides a ritual presentation of food and copulation occurs at the nest. The female lays eggs on alternate days and the clutch size averages about five eggs (the range being two to nine). The eggs are chalky white, somewhat elliptical, and about the size of bantam eggs. Incubation begins as soon as the first egg is laid. While the female is sitting on the nest, the male is constantly bringing more provisions, and they may pile up beside the female. The incubation period is about thirty days, hatching takes place over a prolonged period, and the youngest chick may be several weeks younger than its oldest sibling. In years with a plentiful supply of food, there may be a hatching success rate of about 75%. The male continues to copulate with the female when he brings food, which makes the newly hatched chicks vulnerable to injury.

The chicks are at first covered with greyish-white down and develop rapidly. Within a week they can hold their heads up and shuffle around in the nest. The female tears up the food brought by the male and distributes it to the chicks. Initially, the chicks make a "chittering" sound but this soon changes into a food-demanding "snore". By two weeks old they are already half their adult weight and look naked, as the amount of down is insufficient to cover their growing bodies. By three weeks old, quills are starting to push through the skin and the chicks stand, making snoring noises with wings raised and tail stumps waggling, begging for food items which are now given whole. Atypically among birds, barn owl chicks can "negotiate" and allow weaker ones to eat first, possibly in exchange for grooming. The male is the main provider of food until all the chicks are at least four weeks old, at which time the female begins to leave the nest and starts to roost elsewhere. By the sixth week the chicks are as big as the adults, but have slimmed down somewhat by the ninth week when they are fully fledged and start leaving the nest briefly themselves. They are still dependent on the parent birds until about thirteen weeks and receive training from the female in finding, and eventually catching, prey.

Moulting
Feathers become abraded over time and all birds need to replace them at intervals. Barn owls are particularly dependent on their ability to fly quietly and manoeuvre efficiently. In temperate areas the owls undergo a prolonged moult that lasts through three phases over a period of two years. The female starts to moult while incubating the eggs and brooding the chicks, a time when the male feeds her, so she does not need to fly much. The first primary feather to be shed is a central one, number 6, and it has regrown completely by the time the female resumes hunting. Feathers 4, 5, 7, and 8 are dropped at a similar time the following year and feathers 1, 2, 3, 9 and 10 in the bird's third year of adulthood. The secondary and tail feathers are lost and replaced over a similar timescale, again starting while incubation is taking place. In the case of the tail, the two outermost tail feathers are first shed, followed by the two central ones, the other tail feathers being shed the following year. 

The male owl moults rather later in the year than the female, at a time when there is an abundance of food, the female has recommenced hunting, and the demands of the chicks are lessening. Unmated males without family responsibilities often start losing feathers earlier in the year. Their moult follows a pattern similarly prolonged as that of the female. The first sign that the male is moulting is often when a tail feather has been dropped at the roost. A consequence of moulting is the loss of thermal insulation. This is of little importance in the tropics, and barn owls there usually moult a complete complement of flight feathers annually. The hot-climate moult may still take place over a long period but is usually concentrated at a particular time of year outside the breeding season.

Predators and parasites

Predators of the barn owl include large American opossums (Didelphis), the common raccoon, and similar carnivorous mammals, as well as eagles, larger hawks, and other owls. Among the latter, the great horned owl (Bubo virginianus), in the Americas, and the Eurasian eagle-owl (B. bubo) are noted predators of barn owls. Despite some sources claiming that there is little evidence of predation by great horned owls, one study from Washington found that 10.9% of the local great horned owl's diet was made up of barn owls. In Africa, the principal predators of barn owls are Verreaux's eagle-owls (Bubo lacteus) and Cape eagle-owls (B. capensis). In Europe, although less dangerous than the eagle-owls, the chief diurnal predators are the northern goshawk (Accipiter gentilis) and the common buzzard (Buteo buteo). About 12 other large diurnal raptors and owls have also been reported as predators of barn owls, ranging from the similar-sized Cooper's hawk (Accipiter cooperii) and scarcely larger tawny owl (Strix aluco) to huge bald (Haliaeetus leucocephalus) and golden eagles (Aquila chrysaetos). As a result of improved conservation measures, the populations of the northern goshawk and eagle-owls are increasing, thus increasing the incidence of hunting on barn owls where the species coexist. 

When disturbed at its roosting site, an angry barn owl lowers its head and sways it from side to side, or the head may be lowered and stretched forward and the wings outstretched and drooped while the bird emits hisses and makes snapping noises with its beak. Another defensive attitude involves lying flat on the ground or crouching with wings spread out.

Barn owls are hosts to a wide range of parasites. Fleas are present at nesting sites, and externally the birds are attacked by feather lice and feather mites which chew the barbules of the feathers and which are transferred from bird to bird by direct contact. Blood-sucking flies, such as Ornithomyia avicularia, are often present, moving about among the plumage. Internal parasites include the fluke Strigea strigis, the tapeworm Paruternia candelabraria, several species of parasitic round worm, and spiny-headed worms in the genus Centrorhynchus. These gut parasites are acquired when the birds feed on infected prey. There is some indication that female birds with more and larger spots have a greater resistance to external parasites. This is correlated with smaller bursa of Fabricius, glands associated with antibody production, and a lower fecundity of the blood-sucking fly Carnus hemapterus, which attacks nestlings.

Lifespan

Unusually for a medium-sized carnivorous animal, the barn owl exhibits r-selection, producing a large number of offspring with a high growth rate, which have a low probability of surviving to adulthood. Its typical lifespan is around four years. In Scotland, the species has been recorded living up to 18 and possibly even 34 years. A significant cause of death in temperate areas is starvation, particularly during the winter, and with significant snow cover. 

Collision with road vehicles is another cause of death, and may result when birds forage on mown verges. Some of these birds are in poor condition and may have been less able to evade oncoming vehicles than fit individuals. In some locations, road mortality rates can be particularly high, with collision rates being influenced by higher commercial traffic, roadside verges that are grass rather than shrubs, and where small mammals are abundant. Historically, many deaths were caused by the use of pesticides, and this may still be the case in some parts of the world. Collisions with power-lines kill some birds; and being shot accounts for others, especially in Mediterranean regions.

Status and conservation

Barn owls are relatively common throughout most of their range and not considered globally threatened. If considered as a single global species, the barn owl is the second most widely distributed of all raptors, behind only the peregrine falcon. It is wider-ranging than the also somewhat cosmopolitan osprey. Furthermore, the barn owl is likely the most numerous of all raptors, with the International Union for Conservation of Nature (IUCN) estimating, for all barn owl individuals, a population possibly as large as nearly 10 million individuals (throughout the Americas, the American barn owl species may comprise nearly 2 million). Severe local declines due to organochlorine (e.g., DDT) poisoning in the mid 20th century and rodenticides in the late 20th century have affected some populations, particularly in Europe and North America. Intensification of agricultural practices often means that the rough grassland that provides the best foraging habitat is lost. While barn owls are prolific breeders and able to recover from short-term population decreases, they are not as common in some areas as they used to be. A 1995–1997 survey put their British population at between 3,000 and 5,000 breeding pairs, out of an average of about 150,000 pairs in the whole of Europe. In the US, barn owls are listed as endangered species in seven Midwestern states (Ohio, Michigan, Indiana, Illinois, Wisconsin, Iowa, and Missouri), and in the European Community they are considered a Species of European Concern. 

In Canada, barn owls are no longer common and are most likely to be found in coastal British Columbia south of Vancouver, having become extremely rare in a previous habitat, southern Ontario. In spite of a Recovery Strategy, particularly in 2007–2010 in Ontario, only a handful of wild, breeding barn owls existed in the province in 2018. This is primarily because of disappearing grasslands where the bird hunted in the past, but according to a study, also because of "harsh winters, predation, road mortality and use of rodenticides". The species is listed as endangered overall in Canada, due to loss of habitat and a lack of nesting sites.

In the Canary Islands, a somewhat larger number of these birds still seem to exist on the island of Lanzarote, but altogether this particular subspecies (T. a. gracilirostris, the Canary barn owl) is precariously rare: perhaps fewer than two hundred individuals still remain. Similarly, the birds on the western Canary Islands, which are usually assigned to this subspecies, have severely declined; and wanton destruction of the birds seems to be significant. On Tenerife they seem relatively numerous; but on the other islands the situation looks about as bleak as on Fuerteventura. Due to the assignment to this subspecies of birds common in mainland Spain, the western Canary Islands population is not classified as threatened. 

Nest boxes are used primarily when populations suffer declines. Although such declines have many causes, among them are the lack of available natural nesting sites. Early successes among conservationists have led to the widespread provision of nest boxes, which has become the most used form of population management. The barn owl accepts the provided nest boxes and sometimes prefers them to natural sites. The nest boxes are placed under the eaves of buildings and in other locations. The upper bound of the number of barn owl pairs depends on the abundance of food at nesting sites. Conservationists encourage farmers and landowners to install nest boxes by pointing out that the resultant increased barn owl population would provide natural rodent control. In some conservation projects, the use of rodenticides for pest control was replaced by the installation of nest boxes for barn owls, which has been shown to be a less costly method of rodent control.

Cultural aspects
Common names such as "demon owl", "death owl", "ghost owl", or "lich owl" (from lich, an old term for a corpse) show that rural populations in many places considered barn owls to be birds of evil omen. For example, the Tzeltal people in Mexico regard them as "disease givers". These owls don't "hoot", instead emitting raspy screeches and hissing noises, and their white face and underbelly feathers, visible as they fly overhead, make them look "ghostly". Consequently, they were often killed by farmers who were unaware of the benefits these birds bring. Negative perceptions can also be attributed to the false belief that they could eat large animals, such as chickens and cats. In Thailand, there are similar beliefs like this. Thai people believe when the barn owl flies over or perches on the roof of any house, that house must have its inhabitants die. In South Africa, barn owls are often associated with witchcraft and are persecuted. In some South African cultures, these owls are used in 'muthi' (traditional medicine) and are believed to give special powers when consumed.

In India, beliefs about the barn owl are completely different. Hindus consider the species of owl to be the mount and symbol of Lakshmi, goddess of wealth and fortune.

References

Bibliography

Further reading

External links

 
 BrainMaps: Barn owl brain images
 Barn owl videos, photos and sounds—Internet Bird Collection
 Barn owl—USGS Patuxent Bird Identification InfoCenter
 Barn owl species account—Cornell Lab of Ornithology
 Ageing and sexing barn owls—Blasco-Zumeta, Javier; Heinze, Gerd-Michael
 Barn owl feathers
 Barn Owl sounds

Articles containing video clips
Birds described in 1769
Cosmopolitan birds
Falconry
Taxa named by Giovanni Antonio Scopoli
barn owl
Extant Quaternary first appearances